This is a list of films and television programs shot in Palm Springs, California. It covers filming locations in Palm Springs and other nearby resort communities of the Coachella Valley. These communities, which include Palm Springs, Bermuda Dunes, Cathedral City, Coachella, Desert Hot Springs, Indian Wells, Indio, La Quinta, Mecca, Thermal, Palm Desert, Rancho Mirage, and the Salton Sea, are in Riverside County, southern California. Included are individual episodes of TV series and radio programs.

Films

1910s
In his 1919 book California Desert Trails, travel writer J. Smeaton Chase mentions that motion-picture people were in the Indian Canyons sometime before 1918.

 Salomé – 1918 film
 The Heir to the Hoorah – 1916 film (starring Thomas Meighan, directed by William C. deMille)
 The Lone Star Ranger – 1919 film (starring William Farnum and Louise Lovely)
 The Lone Star Rush – 1915 film (starring Robert Frazer)

1920s

 Desert Gold – 1926 film
 The Covered Wagon – 1922 film
 The Leopard Woman – 1920 film
 The Orphan – 1920 film
 The Sheik – 1921 film

1930s

 Her Jungle Love – 1938 film
 Lost Horizon (a.k.a. Lost Horizon of Shangri-La) – 1937 film
 Palm Springs (a.k.a. Palm Springs Affair) – 1936 film
 Screen Snapshots – 1924–1958 short films
 Series 15, No. 7 (1936)
 Series 16, No. 6 (1937)
 Series 17, No. 5 (1938)
 Springtime in the Rockies – 1937 film
 Sunkist Stars at Palm Springs – 1936 film
 The Painted Stallion – 1937 film
 They Made Me a Criminal – 1939 film
 Under Two Flags – 1936 film (also in La Quinta)
 Whoopee! – 1930 film

1940s

 A Night in Casablanca – 1946 film
 Girl Crazy (a.k.a. When the Girls Meet the Boys) – 1943 film
 Hedda Hopper's Hollywood – 1941–1942 short subjects
 In the Navy – 1941 film
 Objective, Burma! – 1945 film
 Rio Rita – 1942 film
 Sahara – 1943 film
 Song of the Open Road – 1944 film
 The Threat – 1949 film
 The Time, the Place and the Girl – 1946 film
 To the Shores of Tripoli – 1942 film
 Two Guys from Texas – 1948 film
 Wake Island – 1942 film

1950s

 711 Ocean Drive – 1950 film
 Highway Dragnet – 1954 film
 Omar Khayyam – 1957 film
 Raw Edge – 1956 film
 Star Studded Ride – 1954 short film
 Ten Tall Men – 1951 film
 The Beast with a Million Eyes – 1955 film
 The Damned Don't Cry! – 1950 film
 The Desert Rats – 1953 film
 The Monster That Challenged the World – 1957 film
 The Silver Chalice – 1954 film
 The Veils of Bagdad – 1953 film

1960s

 Blood of Dracula's Castle – 1969 film
 Common Law Cabin – 1967 film
 Eegah (a.k.a. Eegah! The Name Written in Blood) – 1962 film
 Palm Springs Weekend – 1963 film
 Tell Them Willie Boy Is Here – 1969 film
 The Professionals – 1966 film
 The Rare Breed – 1966 film
 The Satan Bug – 1965 film
 The Wild Angels – 1966 film
 The Wrecking Crew – 1969 film

1970s

 3 Women – 1977 film
 Damnation Alley – 1977 film
 Diamonds Are Forever – 1971 film
 Gone with the Pope – 1976 film, released in 2010
 Hanging by a Thread – 1979 film
 Institute for Revenge – 1979 TV movie
 Kotch – 1971 film
 The Doll Squad – 1974 film

1980s

 American Gigolo – 1980 film
 Fraternity Vacation – 1985 film
 Heaven – 1987 film
 Less than Zero – 1987 film
 Lethal Weapon 2 – 1989 film
 Pee-wee's Big Adventure – 1985 comedy (at the Cabazon Dinosaurs near Cabazon)
 Rain Man – 1988 film
 Rockin' the Night Away – a 1988 music DVD
 Screenplay – 1984 film
 Tough Guys – 1986 film

1990s

 Bugsy – 1991 film
 City of Industry – 1997 film
 Joshua Tree (a.k.a. Army of One) – 1993 film
 Pacific Heights – 1990 film
 Road Kill – 1999 film
 Six-String Samurai – 1998 film
 Still Kicking: The Fabulous Palm Springs Follies – 1997 short documentary film
 Terminal Velocity – 1994 film
 The Moment After – 1999 film
 The Opposite of Sex – 1998 film
 U Turn (a.k.a. U Turn – ici commence l'enfer) – 1997 film

2000s

 Alpha Dog – 2007 film
 American High School – 2009 direct-to-DVD
 Andrew and Jeremy Get Married – 2004 documentary film
 Auto Focus – 2002 film
 Bone Dry – 2007 film
 Bounce – 2000 film
 Circuit – 2001 film
 Dog Tags – 2008 film
 Dream Slashers – 2007 direct-to-DVD
 Home – 2009 film (documentary by Yann Arthus-Bertrand)
 Into the Wild – 2007 film
 Laughing Matters: The Men – 2008 DVD with Bruce Vilanch and Alec Mapa
 Love Life – 2006 film
 Mission: Impossible III – 2006 film
 Ocean's Eleven – 2001 film
 Overnight – 2003 film
 Phat Girlz – 2006 film
 Poster Boy – 2004 film
 Searchers 2.0 – 2007 film
 Soarin' Over California – 2001 film (part of a visitor attraction at Disneyland)
 The Eyes of Tammy Faye – 2000 documentary
 The Hoax – 2006 film
 The Princess and the Marine – 2001 film (also filmed in Indio)
 The Scorpion King – 2002 film
 Torque – 2004 film
 Trucker – 2007 film
 Visual Acoustics: The Modernism of Julius Shulman – 2009 film
 Wannabe – 2005 film

2010s

 Behind the Candelabra – 2013 HBO film about Liberace
 Douchebag – 2010 film
 Joan Rivers: A Piece of Work – 2010 documentary
 Desert Utopia: Mid-Century Architecture in Palm Springs – 2010/2011 documentary
 Montana Amazon – 2011 film
 Senior Moment – 2017 film (in production)
 Tim and Eric's Billion Dollar Movie – 2012 film

2020s

 Night Train – 2021 film.

Television

  A Lez in Wonderland – 2006 TV documentary
 American Dream Builders – 2014 NBC TV series
 Average Joe – 2004 TV series
 Beverly's Full House – 2011– Oprah Winfrey Network (OWN) TV series
 Biker Build-Off – 2002–2007 TV series
 Bob Hope Television Specials – TV specials
 Bob Hope Special: The Bob Hope Special from Palm Springs (February 13, 1978)
 The Bob Hope Show (January 21, 1989)
 Bob Hope's Yellow Ribbon Party (April 6, 1991)
 Bob Hope Christmas Special: Hopes for the Holidays (1994)
 Boy Meets Boy – 2003 TV series
 Christy Lane's Line Dancing – 1992 VHS taped at Zelda's
 Columbo – 1968–2003 TV series
 Season 1, Episode 6, "Short Fuse" (1971)
 Cops – 1989– TV series
 Season 19, Episode 6, "Drug Arrests #2 Special Edition" (2006)
 Season 19, Episode 24, "Coast to Coast #15" (2007) 
 Downey – 1994 television talk show
 Gene Simmons Family Jewels – 2006– TV series
 Hart to Hart – 1979–1984 TV series (episode in La Quinta)
 Hello Paradise – 2004–2011 TV series
 81 episodes total (which include non-Palm Springs and desert episodes)
 Hidden Palms – 2006 pilot for the 2007 TV series
 I Love Lucy – 1951–1957 TV series (various episodes)
 I Spy – 1965–1968 TV series
 Kate Clinton: The Queen of Comedy – 1996 VHS taped at The Girl Bar during the Club Skirts Dinah Shore Weekend, included Maggie Cassella
 Kathy Griffin: My Life on the D-List – 2005–2010 TV series
 Lea DeLaria: The Queen of Comedy – 1997 VHS taped at The Girl Bar during the 7th Club Skirts Dinah Shore Weekend
 Louis Theroux's Weird Weekends – 1998–2000 TV series
 Season 1, Episode 2, "UFO" (1998)
 Mannix – 1967–1975 TV series
 Season 1, Episode 1, "The Name is Mannix" (1967)
 Martha – 2010– TV series (a.k.a. The Martha Stewart Show)
  "The Palm Springs Show" (May 27, 2010)
 McMillan & Wife – 1971–1977 TV series
 Season 1, Episode 5, "The Face of Murder" (1972)
 Miss California USA – 1989 TV show (for the 1990 Miss California Title)
 Mission: Impossible – 1966–1973 TV series
 Season 6, Episode 3, "The Tram" (1971)
 Mrs. America Pageant – 2005 TV show (for the 2006 Mrs. America Title)
 Newlyweds: Nick and Jessica – 2003–2005 TV series
 Off Limits – 2011– TV series
 Season 2, Episode 7, "Digging for Sea Salt; Demolishing a Bridge; Atop a Tramway" (2012)
 P.S. I Luv U – 1991–1992 TV series
 Rescue 911 – 1989–1996 TV series
 Season 2, Episode 24, "5-Year-Old Dad Save"  (1991, Palm Desert)
 Season 6, Episode 18, "Chance Encounter" (1995)
 Since You've Been Gone – 1998 television film
 Slow Burn – 1986 television film
 Sonny Bono: Pop Songs & Politics – 1998 ABC News documentary
 Southland – 2009– TV series
 Season 2, Episode 4, "The Runner" (2010)
 Tammy Faye: Death Defying – 2004 documentary
 The Bold and the Beautiful – 1987– TV series
 The Dating Game – 1965–1999 TV series
 The F.B.I. – 1965–1974 TV series
 The Frank Sinatra Timex Show – 1957–1960 TV series
 Season 2, Episode 2, "You're invited to spend the afternoon at the Frank Sinatra Show" (1959)
 The Merv Griffin Show – 1963–1986 TV series (a 1960s special episode)
 Throwdown! with Bobby Flay – 2006–2009 TV series
 True Life – 1998– TV series
 Wheeler Dealers – 2003– TV series
 WWE Legends' House – 2012 TV series

Radio
The Amos 'n' Andy and The Jack Benny Program radio shows were frequently broadcast from Palm Springs; also, Eddie Cantor, Al Jolson, and Bob Hope broadcast from the city.

Coachella Valley
 2 Fast 2 Furious – 2003 film (Desert Hot Springs)
 After Dark, My Sweet – 1990 film (Mecca, California)
 America's Tribute to Bob Hope – 1988 documentary (Palm Desert)
 Beverly Hills, 90210 – 1990s TV series (1995 episodes in Rancho Mirage)
 Bombay Beach – 2010 documentary (Bombay Beach, California)
 Coachella: The Film – 2006 documentary about the Coachella Valley Music and Arts Festival in Indio
 Constantine – 2005 film (Eagle Mountain near Desert Center)
 Five Graves to Cairo – 1943 film (Indio)
 Hot Springs Hotel – 1997 Showtime adult comedy series (Desert Hot Springs) with Samantha Phillips
 I Shouldn't Be Alive – 2005– TV series (San Jacinto Mountains, 2010 episode)
 Impostor – 2002 film (Eagle Mountain near Desert Center)
 It's a Mad, Mad, Mad, Mad World – 1963 film (Palm Desert, Twentynine Palms, Yucca Valley and Palm Springs)
 Julie – 1956 film (Indio)
 Little Birds – 2012 film (the Salton Sea)
 Live from Baghdad – 2002 HBO television movie (Eagle Mountain near Desert Center)
 Plagues & Pleasures on the Salton Sea – 2004 documentary (the Salton Sea)
 Rita Rudner: Married Without Children – 1995 HBO performance (Palm Desert)
 River Monsters – 2013 Animal Planet promotional video (Bombay Beach)
 Satan's Sadists – 1969 outlaw biker film (Indio)
 The Beast with a Million Eyes – 1955 film (Coachella Valley)
 The Big Fisherman – 1959 film (La Quinta)
 The Bob Cummings Show – 1955–1959 TV series (portions filmed at the Rancho Las Palmas Country Club in Rancho Mirage)
 The Island – 2005 film (Eagle Mountain and Salton Sea)
 The Kid – 2000 film (Coachella Valley)
 The Long, Long Trailer – 1954 film (on the Pines to Palms Scenic Byway (State Route 74) in Palm Desert)
 The Player – 1992 film (Desert Hot Springs)
 The Salton Sea – 2002 film (Mecca (Box Canyon and Painted Canyon) and the Salton Sea)
 Third World California – 2006 documentary (Lower Coachella Valley)
 Torque – 2004 film (Blythe, Desert Hot Springs, Palm Desert)
 Trista & Ryan's Wedding – a 2003 ABC miniseries (The Lodge luxury resort in Rancho Mirage)
 Twentynine Palms – 2003 film (Twentynine Palms (Drifting Palms) and Coachella Valley)
 Two Guys from Texas – 1948 musical comedy (Rancho Mirage)
 Unknown – 2006 film (Eagle Mountain and Desert Center)

See also

 List of films and TV series set in Palm Springs, California
 List of films shot in Riverside, California
 List of years in film
 List of years in radio
 List of years in television
 Palm Springs in popular culture

References

 "Old Palm Springs Movies" (2001), California's Gold /#0004. VHS videorecording by Huell Howser Productions, in association with KCET/Los Angeles.

Further reading

External links
 City of Palm Springs: Film Permits
Greater Palm Springs Film Alliance & Film Office, Inc.
Riverside County Film Commission, part of the State of California Film Commission 
 Desert Film Society – Palm Springs
 Movies filmed in Palm Springs

 
Palm Springs, California
Films, Palm Springs
Films, Palm Springs
List of films shot in Palm Springs